Players in bold have later been capped at full international level.

Group A

Head coach:

Head coach:

Head coach: Peres Bandeira

Head coach:

Group B

Head coach:

Head coach:

Head coach:

Head coach:

Group C

Head coach:

Head coach:

Head coach:

Head coach:

Group D

Head coach:

Head coach:  Edmund Zientara

Head coach:

Head coach:

References

1978